Renston Rural Historic District is a national historic district located near Winterville, Pitt County, North Carolina. The district encompasses 105 contributing buildings, 6 contributing sites, 7 contributing structures, and 1 contributing object on eight major farms in rural Pitt County near Winterville.  It includes buildings largely dated from about 1890 to 1953 and notable examples of Greek Revival and Classical Revival style architecture. They include the Fletcher Farm, the Charles and Maggie McLawhorn farms, the Langston-Edwards properties, the Dail Farm, the Dennis McLawhorn farms, the McLawhorn-Abbott property, and the Richard Herman McLawhorn farms.  Notable individual buildings include the Joseph Smith House, former Renston School and the first Bethany Free Will Baptist Church, Spier (Speir, Spire) Worthington House (c. 1840), Langston-Edwards House (c. 1840), the Dail House (c. 1850), and the Charles McLawhorn House (c. 1880, moved c. 1890).

It was listed on the National Register of Historic Places in 2003.

References

Historic districts on the National Register of Historic Places in North Carolina
Colonial Revival architecture in North Carolina
Greek Revival architecture in North Carolina
Buildings and structures in Pitt County, North Carolina
National Register of Historic Places in Pitt County, North Carolina